Bariga is a district and suburb in Lagos State, Nigeria. It was formerly under Somolu local government area of Lagos State but in 2013 it was upgraded by the State government as a Local Council Development Area. The local government secretariat is located at 19, Bawala street, Bariga. Arguably defined by its natural style as quick to fit. It presently has as its Chairman Alabi Kolade David. It is the location of the oldest secondary school in Nigeria.

Notable institutions
CMS Grammar School, Lagos
Baptist Academy Obanikoro, Lagos

Notable people
 Olamide – Nigerian rapper
 Lil Kesh – Nigerian rapper, singer
 9ice – Nigerian singer-songwriter
 Kingsley Momoh Nigerian Journalist, Actor & MC

See also

 Bariga Boys

References

Populated places in Lagos
Neighborhoods of Lagos
Slums in Nigeria